Savri Maranan (or Sabri Maranan) is an Israeli sitcom television series.

History
Savri Maranan was produced by Keshet and Tedy. The show was created by Ruby Duenyas and Yaniv Polishook. It originally aired on Channel 2, and currently airs on Channel 12.

In May 2014 the series was sold to TBS, the new American version was called Your Family or Mine. It premiered on April 7, 2015.

Plot

The series stars the family of Shay Rosen and Shani Hasson, who are of different ethnic groups. Shay's family is of Ashkenazi descent, while Shani's family is of Mizrahi descent.

The show follows the family as they visit their extended families for Shabbat dinner, where most of their escapades occur. Most of the show's comedy is derived from stereotypes of the two ethnic groups and the differences between them. 

The show's name is derived from a traditional expression, part of the Kiddush.

Cast

Main Cast
Dvir Benedek as Shai Rosen
Rotem Abuhab as Shani Rosen-Hasson

Rosen Family
Tuvia Tzafir as Pinchas (pini) Rosen, Shai's father
Sandra Sade as Rivka (Riki) Rosen-Pinkus, Shai's mother
Yaniv Polishook as Itamar (Itamarmelada) Rosen, Shai's brother
Liat Har Lev as Michal Rosen, Itamar's wife (seasons 1-2) (In season 3 ex-wife) 
Tom Avni as Adam (Adamke) Rosen, Shai's brother
Yarden Bracha as Sapir (George) Rosen-Cohen, Adam's wife (season 3 - present)
Galit Giat as Liora (Liri) Gabriel, Itamar's girlfriend (season 4 - present)

Hasson Family
Yehoram Gaon as  Silvan (Sali) Hasson, Shani's father
Yona Elian as Rachel Helena Hasson, Shani's mother
Yamit Sol as Orna Katz-Hasson and Efrat Hasson, Shani's sisters
Ami Smolartchik as Moshe Katz, Orna's husband
Kobi Maor as Menachem (Manny) Hasson, Shani's brother
Tamara Klingon as Alin Hasson, Manny's wife
Edna Blilious as Meirav Hasson, Shani's sister
Kobi Farag as Aharon Katz, Moshe's brother and Meirav's husband (season 4 - present)

Production
On June 19, 2012 the series was renewed for a second season. Production began in June 2012 and ended in August 2012.

The third season was announced on March 1, 2016 and it premiered on March 11, 2016.

The fourth season began filming on April 20, 2017 and finished filming on June 13, 2017. The season premiered on November 3, 2017 on the new Keshet 12 channel.

The fifth season began filming on March 25, 2018 and finished filming on May 22, 2018.

The sixth season was announced by Yaniv Polishook on November 26, 2018. Filming started on December 9, 2018 and ended on February 11, 2019.

The seventh season haven't been officially announced yet, but Yaniv Polishook has confirmed that the writing and pre-production has started.

Series Overview

Ratings

Adaptations 
A Greek adaptation under the title Το Σόι σου (romanized: to soi su, English: Your family), premiered on Alpha TV, on October 23, 2014, and concluded its run on June 25, 2019, after five seasons and 307 episodes in total.

On April 7, 2015, an American adaptation of the show premiered in the TBS under the title Your Family or Mine. It only aired for one season.

While not an adaptation of the show, the 2011 British series Friday Night Dinner has some similarities to Savri Maranan.

References

External links
 
 Official website 

Israeli television sitcoms
Channel 2 (Israeli TV channel) original programming
2011 Israeli television series debuts